Stephanie Comilang (born 1980) is a Filipina-Canadian artist and filmmaker working in Toronto and Berlin.

Background 
Stephanie Comilang's parents immigrated from the Philippines to Canada in the 1970s to escape the political unrest of Ferdinand Marcos's dictatorship. Growing up in an immigrant household shaped her idea of home and has served as the starting point for much of her artwork. She graduated from the OCAD University in 2006 with a BFA in Integrated Media.

Artistic career 
Comilang's work is concerned with the concept of home, often dealing with ideas of diaspora and migration. Her documentary approach in constructing narratives stresses themes of social mobility, global labor, and cross-cultural communication. Through the medium of video, Comilang explores the conditions migrants face, looking at exploitation and adversity that groups endure when leaving a country for reasons out of their own control.

Comilang has screened her works at the International Film Festival Rotterdam, the Asia Art Archive in America (New York), SALTS Basel, UCLA, and the GHOST:2561 Bangkok Video and Performance Art Triennale among others.

Video works 
Lumapit Sa Akin, Paraiso (Come to Me, Paradise) (2016), is self-proclaimed "science-fiction documentary". Following three Filipina domestic workers, Irish May Salinas, Lyra Ancheta Torbela and Romylyn Presto Sampaga, who reside in Hong Kong, this 25.44 minute long film narrates the digital communication of these three women who relay their everyday lives of migratory work back to their homes and families. A drone camera that shot most of the videos footage has been titled Paradise, which is voiced by Comilang's mother, Emily Comilang. Paradise functions as both a narrator but also symbol through which the three protagonists digital communication of calling home is transmitted through. Identifications of being between, are meditated on in this piece through the use of technology, attention to time, and the protagonists as subjects of diaspora. Comilang demonstrates the complex ways in which these women must reconcile notions of space and home through the migratory experience.

Yesterday, In the Years 1886 and 2017 (2017), consists of a two-channel 10-minute video and installation commissioned by Artspeak in Vancouver. Artspeak Editor, Danelle Ortiz, speaks on this piece stating, "While this film speaks to a specific place and particular people, the role of the disembodied narrator, casts a wider net of questions around mobility, a rearrangement of geographic concepts of centre/periphery, and the disruption of historical linearity and continuity."

Other works 
Children of the King (2011), short film

Documentary-style short film expanded from a zine Comilang made when she was 18, about her conflicted feelings towards her father's hobby of being an Elvis impersonator. Comilang traveled to Manila, Bangkok, and Tokyo which apparently have the highest number of Elvis impersonators per capita, to interview families of these fathers and their shared experience. This film explored the ways in which American imperialism pervaded these individuals experience through familial relationships, and also created a bond through which the "offspring of the king" could connect to each other.

It All Makes Sense (2019), video and light installation

A video and light installation for Nuit Blanche recreating the first time Comilang saw Perfumed Nightmare (1977) by Kidlat Tahimik, an influential figure in Filippino independent cinema who sparked Comilang’s interest in cinema and set a precedent for what she could create.  Like Comilang’s father, Kidlat Tahimik came from Baguio, an old American air base on Luzon island in the Philippines. Perfumed Nightmare, at the time was unlike anything Comilang had seen before, and being created by such a relatable figure, impacted Comilang’s creative practice.

Awards 
Comilang was the winner of the Sobey Art Award in 2019 with her piece titled, Lumapit Sa Akin, Paraiso (Come to Me, Paradise) (2016).

References 

Canadian video artists
Women video artists
Filipino artists
Canadian contemporary artists
OCAD University alumni
21st-century Canadian women artists
1980 births
Living people